Stillach is a river of Bavaria, Germany. At its confluence with the Breitach and the Trettach in Oberstdorf, the Iller is formed.

See also
List of rivers of Bavaria

References

Rivers of Bavaria
Rivers of Germany